Kansas City Air Route Traffic Control Center (Kansas City Center in radio communications), is one of 22 Federal Aviation Administration (FAA) Area Control Centers. It is located at 250 S. Rogers Rd. Olathe, Kansas, United States.

The primary responsibility of Kansas City Center is sequencing and separation of over-flights, arrivals, and departures in order to provide safe, orderly, and expeditious flow of aircraft filed under instrument flight rules (IFR).

Kansas City Center is the 15th busiest ARTCC in the United States. Between January 1, 2017, and December 31, 2017, Kansas City Center handled 1,801,888 aircraft operations. Kansas City Center covers approximately 192,000 square miles of the Midwestern United States, Southern United States, and the Western United States, including parts of Kansas, Oklahoma, Illinois, Arkansas, Nebraska, Iowa, Texas, New Mexico, Colorado, and Missouri.

Kansas City Center lies adjacent to seven Air Route Traffic Control Centers, including Minneapolis Air Route Traffic Control Center, Chicago Air Route Traffic Control Center, Indianapolis Air Route Traffic Control Center, Memphis Air Route Traffic Control Center, Fort Worth Air Route Traffic Control Center, Denver Air Route Traffic Control Center, and Albuquerque Air Route Traffic Control Center. ZKC overlies or abuts many approach control facilities (including Kansas City, Oklahoma City, St. Louis, Tulsa, Springfield, MO, and Wichita).

References

External links
 Kansas City Center Weather Service Unit (CWSU) (NWS/FAA)

Air traffic control centers
Air traffic control in the United States
Transportation in Olathe, Kansas
Transportation in Kansas
Aviation in Kansas